The Department of Municipalities, Culture and Housing  was a part of the Government of New Brunswick.  It was charged with the planning and supervision of local government and the development and administration of programs in support of affordable housing, home ownership and the enhancement of community life in New Brunswick. This department took over the functions of the former Department of Municipal Affairs in 1991. In 1998, most of the department's functions were transferred to the new Department of Municipalities and Housing.

Ministers

References 
 List of ministers and deputy ministers by department, New Brunswick Legislative Library  (pdf)

Defunct New Brunswick government departments and agencies